Frank Cornelius Peters (July 5, 1920 – October 7, 1987) was the second president of Wilfrid Laurier University. He held the position from 1967 to 1978.

References

External links
 Frank Cornelius Peters at The Global Anabaptist Mennonite Encyclopedia Online

1920 births
1987 deaths
Canadian university and college chief executives
Academic staff of Wilfrid Laurier University